The Herschel Baronetcy, of Slough in the County of Buckingham, was a title in the Baronetage of the United Kingdom. It was created on 17 July 1838 for John Herschel, son of the famous astronomer Sir William Herschel, and a well-known astronomer in his own right. The baronetcy became extinct on the death of the third baronet on 15 June 1950.

Herschel baronets, of Slough (1838)
Sir John Frederick William Herschel, 1st Baronet (1792–1871)
Sir William James Herschel, 2nd Baronet (1833–1917)
Rev. Sir John Frederick Charles Herschel, F.R.A.S., 3rd Baronet (1869–1950)

Arms

References

Sources
 

Extinct baronetcies in the Baronetage of the United Kingdom
Herschel family